High Society is an American sitcom television series starring Jean Smart and Mary McDonnell that aired Monday nights on CBS from October 30, 1995, to February 26, 1996; it was entered into the CBS schedule as a replacement for If Not for You, a sitcom that was quickly canceled by the network. The theme song was "The Lady Is a Tramp" sung by Chaka Khan.

Its premise was similar to the campy British comedy series Absolutely Fabulous.

Storyline
The series revolves around two New York City women who acted in an outrageous, campy, and decadent manner. Ellie Walker (Jean Smart) is a successful author of trashy romantic novels, and her best friend and publisher is Dorothy 'Dott' Emerson (Mary McDonnell). Emerson is a divorced mother with a preppie college-aged son, Brendan Emerson (Dan O'Donahue), a College Republican, who resists Ellie's relentless sexual advances. At the publishing house, the women worked with a flamboyant gay male secretary named Stephano (Luigi Amodeo) and a sleazy publisher partner named Peter Thomas (David Rasche)

In the pilot episode, the women's small-town former college friend, Val Brumberg (Faith Prince), arrives after she decides to leave her philandering husband, Mitchell, one of Ellie's many exes. Val moves in with Dott, much to Ellie's chagrin who stops speaking to Dott because of this. Val later reveals the other reason she came to Dott is because she's pregnant and needs someone to help her through her pregnancy. Aside from the situational comedy that arose from Ellie and Dott's campy antics, the storylines often centered on the notion of family. Val started to become something of a mother figure to Brendan. However, she was written out of the series without explanation after the sixth episode of the series. The series then centered more on the campy lifestyle and antics of Ellie and Dott.

Cancellation
Despite garnering decent ratings, the series was canceled after 13 episodes and replaced with Good Company.

Cast

Main
 Jean Smart as Ellie Walker
 Mary McDonnell as Dorothy "Dott" Emerson
 Dan O'Donahue as Brendan Emerson
 David Rasche as Peter Thomas
 Faith Prince as Valerie "Val" Brumberg (episodes 1–6)
 Luigi Amodeo as Stephano

Recurring
 Jayne Meadows as Alice Morgan-DuPont-Sutton-Cushing-Ferruke

Guest stars
Barry Bostwick as Michael 
Bronson Pinchot as Fred 
Doris Roberts as Maggie 
Paul Dooley as Harry 
Tom Arnold as Tony

Episodes

Award nominations

References

External links
 

1995 American television series debuts
1996 American television series endings
1990s American sitcoms
CBS original programming
English-language television shows
Television series by Warner Bros. Television Studios
 Television shows set in New York City